The 2014 Japan Women's Open was a women's tennis tournament played on outdoor hard courts. It was the sixth edition of the Japan Women's Open, and part of the WTA International tournaments of the 2014 WTA Tour. It was held at the Utsubo Tennis Center in Osaka, Japan, from October 6 through October 12, 2014.

Points and prize money

Point distribution

Prize money

1 Qualifiers prize money is also the Round of 32 prize money
* per team

Singles main-draw entrants

Seeds

 Rankings are as of September 29, 2014

Other entrants
The following players received wildcards into the singles main draw:
  Kristina Mladenovic
  Naomi Osaka
  Risa Ozaki

The following players received entry from the qualifying draw:
  Shuko Aoyama
  Ana Bogdan
  Chan Yung-jan
  Hiroko Kuwata

The following player received entry as a lucky loser:
  Miharu Imanishi

Withdrawals
Before the tournament
  Kimiko Date-Krumm
  Casey Dellacqua (lower leg injury)
  Julia Görges
  Kurumi Nara (respiratory illness)
  Paula Ormaechea
  Alison Van Uytvanck

Retirements
  Jarmila Gajdošová (left ankle sprain)
  Madison Keys (right rib injury)

Doubles main-draw entrants

Seeds

1 Rankings are as of September 29, 2014

Other entrants
The following pairs received wildcards into the doubles main draw:
  Kyōka Okamura /  Kotomi Takahata
  Naomi Osaka /  Risa Ozaki

Champions

Singles

 Samantha Stosur def.  Zarina Diyas, 7–6(9–7), 6–3
 It was Stosur's 1st title of the year, her 3rd title at the HP Open, and the 6th title of her career.

Doubles

 Shuko Aoyama /  Renata Voráčová def.  Lara Arruabarrena /  Tatjana Maria, 6–1, 6–2

External links

 
2014
Japan Women's Open
Japan Women's Open
Japan Women's Open